The  is an Imperial residence in Tokyo.

From 1931 to 2004, it was the residence of Nobuhito, Prince Takamatsu and his spouse, Kikuko, Princess Takamatsu. On March 31, 2020, the Emperor emeritus Akihito and the Empress emerita Michiko moved in.

History 
The residence was the site of the secondary Edo residence of the Hosokawa clan. In 1891, it was chosen to be the residence of Masako, Princess Tsune and Fusako, Princess Kane, two daughters of the Emperor. Hirohito resided as the Crown Prince between 1913 and 1924. It became the residence of Nobuhito in 1931, and a building in Tudor style and a Japanese style building were built. They survived the war, but part of the grounds were confiscated. On those grounds were built the Takamatsu Junior high school and public residences.

The western style building was dismantled in 1972, and a new reinforced concrete residence was built in its place. Kikuko resided until her death in 2004, after which the residence was unused.

Temporary Emeritus Imperial Palace 
The Takanawa residence was chosen as a Temporary palace for Akihito and Michiko during the refurbishment of the Akasaka Palace (current Togu palace), which will be their . It became the  when they moved in on March 31, 2020.

References 

Imperial residences in Japan
Palaces in Tokyo